The Vincent Scully Prize was established in 1999 to recognize exemplary practice, scholarship or criticism in architecture, historic preservation and urban design. Created by the National Building Museum in Washington, D.C., the award first honored the distinguished Yale professor and namesake of the award, author and educator, Vincent Scully.
The Museum’s website states that the Prize is awarded annually, however no award was made in 2003, 2004, 2015 or 2016. These omissions are not explained on the website.
The 2014 Prize was presented to former talk show host Charlie Rose. The Museum website no longer lists Rose as a winner of the Prize.
The National Building Museum awards two other annual prizes: the Honor Award for individuals and organizations who have made important contributions to the U.S.'s building heritage, and the Henry C. Turner Prize for Innovation in Construction Technology.

Recipients

References

External links
National Building Museum: Vincent Scully Award

Architecture awards